Public School No. 4 , also known as Columbus School, is a historic elementary school located at Baltimore, Maryland, United States. It is a two-story Romanesque Revival styled structure constructed in 1891 and expanded in 1905 and 1912.  It features a three-story central square tower with pyramidal roof and a flanking pair of cylindrical corner towers with conical roofs. The structure was used as the South Clifton Park Community Center.

Public School No.4 was listed on the National Register of Historic Places in 1979.

The building has been converted to apartments.

References

External links
, including photo from 1978, at Maryland Historical Trust
Columbus School Apartments

Broadway East, Baltimore
Defunct schools in Maryland
Public schools in Baltimore
Romanesque Revival architecture in Maryland
School buildings completed in 1891
School buildings on the National Register of Historic Places in Baltimore